Ninh Giang may refer to several places in Vietnam:

Ninh Giang District, a rural district of Hải Dương Province
, a ward of Ninh Hòa town
Ninh Giang, Hải Dương, a township and capital of Ninh Giang District
, a rural commune of Hoa Lư District